The St. Cloud State Huskies women's ice hockey program represented St. Cloud State University during the 2015-16 NCAA Division I women's ice hockey season.

Recruiting

2015–16 Huskies

Schedule

|-
!colspan=12 style=""| Regular Season

|-
!colspan=12 style=""| WCHA Tournament

Awards and honors

Molly Illikainen, Forward, WCHA Third Team All-Star

Julia Tylke, Forward, WCHA All-Rookie Team

References

St. Cloud State
St. Cloud State Huskies women's ice hockey seasons
St. Cloud
2015 in sports in Minnesota
2016 in sports in Minnesota